Bookham railway station is in the village of Great Bookham in Surrey, England. It also serves the adjacent village of Little Bookham.

The station is managed by South Western Railway, which provides the majority of train services; Southern also provides some peak-period services.

History
Bookham railway station was opened on 2 February 1885; the line at the time was owned by the London and South Western Railway.

It effectively remained in an open-field setting until the later 1950s/early 1960s when there was a massive expansion of the village, with new estates built to fill the space between the high street and station, leaving only National Trust-owned land as a "green corridor" along parts of Church Road.

The station buildings remain largely unchanged to this day, including the footbridge and platform canopies, however, the station master's house has been sold off as a private dwelling.

Immediately to the west of the station the original goods siding was removed in the 1960s and the associated goods shed (used as a coal depot by local businessman Howard Weale at that time) was finally demolished in the 1990s having lived on for a time as a builder's yard (Tredan) and then offices.

There are now scant landmarks to identify it as the original siding and goods yard. The siding area was for a period home to a blacksmith, but that land was sold for housing development, and where the shed once stood is now a purpose-built office block.

Services
All services at Bookham are operated by South Western Railway using  EMUs.

The typical off-peak service in trains per hour is:
 1 tph to  via 
 1 tph to 

Additional services run during the peak hours, increasing the service to 2 tph in each direction.

References

External links

Railway stations in Surrey
Former London and South Western Railway stations
Railway stations in Great Britain opened in 1885
Railway stations served by South Western Railway